Hansjörg Dittus (born 1957) is a German physicist, affiliated with the German Aerospace Center as director of the Institute of Space Systems and executive board member for Space Research and Technology. His fields of expertise are gravitational physics, metrology, inertial sensors. He is involved in many space-based experiments aimed at testing foundational issues of gravitational interaction. He collaborates with the Center of Applied Space Technology and Microgravity (ZARM) at the University of Bremen.

Awards and honors 
Asteroid 310652 Hansjörgdittus, discovered by astronomers with the Asiago-DLR Asteroid Survey at Cima Ekar in 2002, was named in his honor. The official  was published by the Working Group Small Body Nomenclature of the IAU on 8 November 2021.

References

External links 
 H. Dittus webpage
 

21st-century German physicists
Academic staff of the University of Bremen
Living people
1957 births
Place of birth missing (living people)